Albert Cecil Williams (born September 22, 1929) is an American pastor, community leader, and author who is the pastor emeritus of Glide Memorial United Methodist Church.

Early life

One of six children, Williams was born in San Angelo, Texas to Earl Williams Sr. He had  four brothers, Earl Jr., Reedy, Claudius "Dusty", Jack and a sister, Johnny. 

He received a Bachelor of Arts degree in Sociology from Huston–Tillotson University in 1952. He was one of the first five African American graduates of the Perkins School of Theology at Southern Methodist University in 1955. He became the pastor of Glide Memorial Church in San Francisco, California in 1963, and founded the Council on Religion and the Homosexual the following year. He welcomed everyone to participate in services and hosted political rallies in which Angela Davis and the Black Panthers spoke and lectures by personalities as diverse as Bill Cosby and Billy Graham. When Patty Hearst was kidnapped by the Symbionese Liberation Army, Williams attempted to negotiate a deal for her release.

In 1967, Williams had the cross removed from the church's sanctuary, saying it was a symbol of death and that his congregation should instead celebrate life and living. "We must all be the cross," he explained.

LGBT rights activism
Drawing on his experiences in the civil rights movement, Williams was one of the first African-Americans to become involved in the gay rights movement. In 1964, he gave a speech at the Society for Individual Rights in San Francisco, which was more outspoken than the contemporary Mattachine Society. Based on the contemporary campaign for African-American voting rights, he suggested that gays should use their votes to gain political power and effect change. In his advice for gay movement to create tensions, he echoed Martin Luther King Jr.'s Letter from Birmingham Jail:

Legacy

Under his leadership, Glide Memorial became a 10,000-member congregation of all races, ages, genders, ethnicities, sexual orientations, and religions. It is the largest provider of social services in the city, serving over three thousand meals a day, providing AIDS/HIV screenings, offering adult education programs, and giving assistance to women dealing with homelessness, domestic violence, substance abuse, and mental health issues.

Williams retired as pastor in 2000 having turned 70 years old, the mandatory age of retirement for pastors employed by the United Methodist Church.  (Pastors in the United Methodist Church are not employed by the local church or congregation. Instead, UMC pastors are assigned to a local church by the presiding bishops of the global Church.) When Williams became ineligible for assignment to a congregation by the episcopate, the local congregation and affiliated non-profit foundation hired Williams to fill a new office entitled Minister of Liberation. The position was created to allow Williams to officially continue to serve the community and church.

In August 2013, the intersection of Ellis and Taylor Streets (location of the Glide church in San Francisco) was renamed "Rev. Cecil Williams Way" in honor of Williams.

Both Williams and the church are featured in the 2006 film The Pursuit of Happyness.

Personal life
Williams was married to school teacher Evelyn Robinson (1928–1981) from 1956 until their divorce in 1976. They had two children, a son, Albert and a daughter, Kim. He was married to Janice Mirikitani, a poet, from 1982 until her death in 2021.

Bibliography

References

External links

People from San Angelo, Texas
African-American Methodist clergy
American Methodist clergy
Huston–Tillotson University alumni
Perkins School of Theology alumni
1929 births
Living people
Religious leaders from the San Francisco Bay Area
American United Methodist clergy
American LGBT rights activists
21st-century African-American people
20th-century African-American people
Activists from Texas